Sufi Sheykh Daz (also Romanized as Şūfī Sheykh Dāz; also known as Şūfī Sheykh Dār) is a village in Tamran Rural District, in the Central District of Kalaleh County, Golestan Province, Iran. At the 2006 census, its population was 1,099, in 202 families.

References 

Populated places in Kalaleh County